Pithapuram, historically known as Pittapore, is a town and a municipality in the Kakinada district in the Indian state of Andhra Pradesh. The town also forms a part of Godavari Urban Development Authority. The town is home to one of the eighteen Maha Sakthi Peethas, which are significant shrines and pilgrimage destinations in Shaktism.

Sripada Sri Vallabha, a prominent Hindu saint of 14th century was born and lived in Pithapuram. He is considered by his devotees as one of the first complete avatars (incarnations) of the deity Dattatreya in Kali Yuga.

History 

Pithapuram was originally called Pithikapuram. The earliest extant inscription to mention the city is the fourth century king Samudragupta's Allahabad Pillar inscription, which states that he defeated the king Mahendra of Pithikapuram. The inscriptions of the fourth and fifth century Vasishtha and Mathara dynasties also mention Pishtapura, describing it as a part of Kalinga. In the seventh century, the Chalukya king Pulakeshin II annexed Pishtapura to his kingdom. Later, Pithapuram was one of the Rastras, an administrative division, of the Vengi Chalukyas. One of the collateral branches of Chalukyas called Pithapuram Chalukyas, ruled the area around Rajahmundry, Pithapuram and Draksharama in the 12th and 13th centuries.

The town hosts temple of Puruhitika devi. It is one among 18 Sakthi Peethas.

Geography 
It is located near several beaches though not one in particular. It is in between 2 major cities; Kakinada and Rajahmundry. Pithapuram is landlocked and most of its economic activity takes place in Kakinada. Pithapuram is also well known for the C.B.M. Christian Medical Centre which was started by missionary doctor Dr. E. Smith.

Demographics 
The total
population constitutes  males,  females and
 children, in the age group of 0–6 years. The average literacy rate stands at
75.00% with  literates, higher than the national average of 73.00%.

Transport 
Pithapuram town is situated on NH 216. Pithapuram railway station is located on Duvvada-Vijayawada section of Howrah-Chennai main line.

Notable residents 

 Devulapalli Krishnasastry

References 

Cities and towns in Kakinada district
Ancient Indian cities
Buddhist pilgrimage sites in India
Archaeological sites in Andhra Pradesh
Hindu holy cities
Former capital cities in India